The Belgrade Marathon is a marathon race held annually in Belgrade since 1988. It is typically held in mid-April and also features a half marathon and a fun run for the public.  The Belgrade Marathon is one of the biggest sporting events in Serbia.

History 
A marathon existed in 1910 from Obrenovac to Belgrade.

A group of enthusiasts came up with a plan to restore the 1910 race.

Since 1990 the Belgrade Marathon has a standard  length.

The 1999 NATO bombing of Yugoslavia did not prevent the marathon from taking place that year, and on April 17 the race was held as a metered group run. About 40 runners from nine countries crossed the finish line at 3 hours 15 minutes and 16 seconds. The runners from NATO countries were Seine Brenson from the US, and Michael Turzynski and Heinz Lorber from Germany. The latter two are also founding members of the German 100 Marathon Club.

The Yugoslav Sport Society "Partizan" took it upon itself to organize the marathon. The City of Belgrade, its departments and communal services helped organize the event. Also involved were the executive bodies of city government, the Army of Serbia, the  Serbian Police, and a number of sponsors. In September 2003, Belgrade declared that the Marathon is an event of special importance for the city. The same organisers also arrange the Belgrade Race Through History, a race around the city's Kalemegdan fortress, which started in 1996.

In 2020, the race was initially postponed to 18 October 2020 due to the coronavirus pandemic.  However, the marathon was eventually cancelled after the organizers were unable to secure approval to hold the marathon with coronavirus controls in place.
In 2022 race, there was 668 finishers (105 women's and 563 men's) from 41 countries.

Other races 

In addition to the marathon, the event also holds three other races.
 The Kids Marathon is a race for children
 The Fun Run is the event with the most participants (5 km)
 The Half-marathon is a half-distance marathon that is in accordance with world standards

Winners 

  Course record
  Serbian championship race

Gallery

Notes

References

List of winners
Karamata, Ozren (2010-04-20). Beogradski Marathon. Association of Road Racing Statisticians. Retrieved on 2010-04-21.

External links

 Belgrade City Marathon
 Marathon Info
 Run, World, Run -- And Stop the War!

Marathons in Serbia
Sport in Belgrade
Recurring sporting events established in 1988
Spring (season) events in Serbia